Julio Acosta may refer to:
 Julio Acosta García (1872–1954), president of Costa Rica
 Julio Acosta (weightlifter) (born 1987), Cuban-born Chilean weightlifter